Hong Song-nam (born 12 February 1947) is a North Korean former footballer. He competed in the men's tournament at the 1976 Summer Olympics.

References

External links
 

1947 births
Living people
North Korean footballers
North Korea international footballers
Olympic footballers of North Korea
Footballers at the 1976 Summer Olympics
Place of birth missing (living people)
Association football forwards
Footballers at the 1978 Asian Games
Asian Games medalists in football
Asian Games gold medalists for North Korea
Medalists at the 1978 Asian Games